The Gospels of Henry the Lion were intended by Henry the Lion, Duke of Saxony, for the altar of the Virgin Mary in the church of St. Blaise's Abbey, Brunswick, better known as Brunswick Cathedral. The volume is considered a masterpiece of Romanesque book illumination of the 12th century.

The gospel book was made for the duke on commission at the Benedictine Helmarshausen Abbey. As for its date, the church in Brunswick was built in 1173, and the altar of the Virgin Mary was dedicated in 1188. The creation of the gospel book was formerly placed by most authorities at about 1175 ("early dating") but today the balance of opinion puts it at about 1188 ("late dating").

The manuscript, containing 266 pages with the text of the four gospels, 50 of them full page illustrations, was sold by auction on 6 December 1983 at Sotheby's in London for £8,140,000. The purchase price was raised, in the context of a German national initiative for the preservation of national treasures, by the German government, the Bundesländer of Lower Saxony and Bavaria, the Stiftung Preussischer Kulturbesitz and private donors (largely from Brunswick). It was the most expensive book in the world until 1994, when Bill Gates bought the Codex Leicester, a manuscript by Leonardo da Vinci.

The gospel book, preserved completely intact, with 50 full page miniatures, is kept in the Herzog August Bibliothek in Wolfenbüttel, and for security reasons is displayed only once every two years.

See also
Guelph Treasure
List of most expensive books and manuscripts

References

Das Evangeliar Heinrichs des Löwen. Complete facsimile of Codex Guelf. Noviss. 2°, Herzog August Bibliothek in Wolfenbüttel (also Clm 30055 of the Bayerische Staatsbibliothek in Munich). 1,000 numbered copies of the manuscript in 2 volumes (facsimile and commentary). Frankfurt am Main. 1989 
Abs, H. J., Fleckenstein, J., Kötzsche., D., 1985. Evangeliar Heinrichs des Löwen. Documentation to the authorised facsimile edition. Frankfurt am Main: Insel- Verlag. 
Kötzsche, D. (ed.), 1989.  Das Evangeliar Heinrichs des Löwen. Commentary on the facsimile. Frankfurt am Main. 
Klemm. E., 1988. Das Evangeliar Heinrichs des Löwen erläutert. Frankfurt am Main. 
Gospels of Henry the Lion: Sale Catalogue, 6 December 1983. Sotheby's, London.
Walther, Ingo F. and Norbert Wolf. Codices Illustres: The world's most famous illuminated manuscripts, 400 to 1600. Köln, TASCHEN, 2005.

External links

Herzog August Bibliothek Wolfenbüttel: Digital facsimile of manuscript

Gospel Books
12th-century books
12th-century illuminated manuscripts
Herzog August Library
Culture in Braunschweig
Christianity in Braunschweig